Senator Innes may refer to:

Charles Hiller Innes (1870–1939), Massachusetts State Senate
Charles John Innes (1901–1971), Massachusetts State Senate
Daniel Innis (born 1963), New Hampshire State Senate